Events in the year 1936 in Paraguay.

Incumbents
President: Eusebio Ayala until February 17, Rafael Franco

Events
September 5 - former President Ayala leaves Paraguay for Buenos Aires, Argentina, accompanied by general and future president José Félix Estigarribia

Births

References

 
1930s in Paraguay